Akhtaruzzaman is a Bangladesh Awami League politician and the former Member of Parliament of Gazipur-3.

Career
Akhtaruzzaman was elected to parliament from Gazipur-3 as a Bangladesh Awami League candidate in 1996. He is the chairman of Gazipur District council.

References

Awami League politicians
Living people
5th Jatiya Sangsad members
Year of birth missing (living people)